Davydiv Brid (literally David's Ford) is a village in Beryslav Raion, Kherson Oblast, southern Ukraine, about  northeast of the centre of Kherson city. It belongs to the Velyka Oleksandrivka settlement hromada, one of the hromadas of Ukraine. The village lies besides the Inhulets river. The border of Kherson Oblast with Mykolaiv Oblast runs on the north-west side of the village.

History 
During the Russian Empire, Davydiv Brid was the administrative center of the Davydobrodska Volost, one of the volosts of Khersonskiy Uyezd.

In 1886, the village had a population of 683.

At least 144 residents of Davydiv Brid died during the Holodomor.

Davydiv Brid was captured by Russian forces during its 2022 invasion of Ukraine, and was later the center of fighting during the battle of Davydiv Brid. Davydiv Brid was liberated by Ukrainian forces on October 4.

Demographics
According to the 2001 Ukrainian Census, the village had 1223 inhabitants.

The native language of the village as of 2001 were:

References

Villages in Beryslav Raion